Osgar O'Hoisin (born 3 September 1996) is an Irish tennis player. He has a career high ATP singles ranking of No. 747 achieved on 14 November 2022, and a career high doubles ranking of No. 703 achieved on 7 November 2022.

O'Hoisin is a multiple time club champion in his boyhood club Donnybrook Tennis Club, in Dublin, Ireland. He was Irish under-18 champion in 2012 and 2015. He attended the University of Wisconsin–Madison, and played for the Wisconsin Badgers tennis team between 2015 and 2019.

O'Hoisin has represented Ireland at the Davis Cup since 2018. He has a win–loss record of 2–4 in singles and 3–1 in doubles. In 1922 he won the deciding match in Ireland's 3–2 win against Barbados in the World Group II competition.

References

External links

1996 births
Living people
Irish male tennis players
Sportspeople from Madison, Wisconsin
Tennis players from Dublin (city)
Tennis people from Wisconsin
Wisconsin Badgers men's tennis players